Office of the Information Commissioner may refer to:
Information Commissioner's Office, the UK non-departmental public body and regulator for data protection
 Office of the Information Commissioner of Canada
Office of the Information Commissioner (New South Wales), the New South Wales government agency within the Office of the Information and Privacy Commission (New South Wales)
 Office of the Information Commissioner Queensland, an agency of the Department of Justice and Attorney-General
 Office of the Information Commissioner (Oifig an Choimisinéara Faisnéise) is the official charged with regulating the Irish Freedom of Information Act.